Luoyang  is a city located in the confluence area of the Luo River and the Yellow River in the west of Henan province. Governed as a prefecture-level city, it borders the provincial capital of Zhengzhou to the east, Pingdingshan to the southeast, Nanyang to the south, Sanmenxia to the west, Jiyuan to the north, and Jiaozuo to the northeast. As of December 31, 2018, Luoyang had a population of 6,888,500 inhabitants with 2,751,400 people living in the built-up (or metro) area made of the city's five out of six urban districts (except the Jili District not continuously urbanized) and Yanshi District, now being conurbated.

Situated on the central plain of China, Luoyang is among the oldest cities in China and one of the cradles of Chinese civilization. It is the earliest of the Four Great Ancient Capitals of China.

Names

The name "Luoyang" originates from the city's location on the north or sunny ("yang") side of the Luo River. Since the river flows from west to east and the sun is to the South of the river, the sun always shines on the north side of the river. Luoyang has had several names over the centuries, including Luoyi and Luozhou, though Luoyang has been its primary name.  It has also been called Dongdu during the Tang dynasty, Xijing during the Song dynasty, or Jingluo.  During the rule of Wu Zetian, the only female emperor in Chinese history, the city was known as Shendu. Luoyang was renamed Henanfu during the Qing dynasty but regained its former name in 1912.

History

Classical era

The greater Luoyang area has been sacred ground since the late Neolithic period. This area at the intersection of the Luo River and Yi River was considered to be the geographical center of China. Because of this sacred aspect, several cities – all of which are generally referred to as "Luoyang" – have been built in this area. In 2070 BC, the Xia dynasty king Tai Kang moved the Xia capital to the intersection of the Luo and Yi and named the city Zhenxun. The ruins of Western Bo are located in Luoyang Prefecture.

In 1036 BC a settlement named Chengzhou was constructed by the Duke of Zhou for the remnants of the captured Shang nobility. The Duke also moved the Nine Tripod Cauldrons to Chengzhou from the Zhou dynasty capital at Haojing. Wangcheng became the capital of the Eastern Zhou dynasty in 771 BC. The Eastern Zhou dynasty capital was moved to Chengzhou in 510 BC. Later, the Eastern Han dynasty capital of Luoyang would be built over Chengzhou. Modern Luoyang is built over the ruins of Wangcheng, which are still visible today at Wangcheng Park.

Qin Shi Huang's chief minister, Lu Buwei, was given Luoyang. Lu began programs to develop and beautify Luoyang. It is said that Liu Bang visited Luoyang and considered making it his capital but was persuaded to reconsider by his ministers to turn to Chang'an instead for his capital.

Han dynasty

In 25 AD, Luoyang was declared the capital of the Eastern Han dynasty on November 27 by Emperor Guangwu of Han.  The city walls formed a rectangle 4 km south to north and 2.5 km west to east, with the Gu River, a tributary of the Luo River just outside the northern eastern walls.  The rectangular Southern Palace and the Northern Palace were 3 km apart and connected by The Covered Way.  In 26, the Altar of the Gods of the Soils and Grains, the Altar of Heaven, and the Temple of the eminent Founder, Emperor Gao of Former Han were inaugurated.  The Imperial University was restored in 29.  In 48, the Yang Canal linked the capital to the Luo.  In 56, main imperial observatory, the Spiritual Terrace, was constructed.

For several centuries, Luoyang was the focal point of China. In AD 68, the White Horse Temple, the first Buddhist temple in China, was founded in Luoyang. The temple still exists, though the architecture is of later origin, mainly from the 16th century. An Shigao was one of the first monks to popularize Buddhism in Luoyang.

The ambassador Banchao restored the Silk Road in Eastern Han dynasty and this has made the capital city Luoyang the start of Silk Road

In 166 AD, the first Roman mission, sent by "the king of Da Qin [the Roman Empire], Andun" (Marcus Aurelius Antoninus, r. 161–180 AD), reached Luoyang after arriving by sea in Rinan Commandery in what is now central Vietnam.

The late 2nd century saw China decline into anarchy:

The decline was accelerated by the rebellion of the Yellow Turbans, who, although defeated by the Imperial troops in 184 AD, weakened the state to the point where there was a continuing series of rebellions degenerating into civil war, culminating in the burning of the Han capital of Luoyang on 24 September 189 AD. This was followed by a state of continual unrest and wars in China until a modicum of stability returned in the 220s, but with the establishment of three separate kingdoms, rather than a unified empire.

On April 4, 190 AD, Chancellor Dong Zhuo ordered his soldiers to ransack, pillage, and raze the city as he retreated from the coalition set up against him by regional lords all over China. The court was subsequently moved to the more defensible western city of Chang'an (modern Xi'an). Following a period of disorder, during which warlord Cao Cao held the last Han emperor Xian in Xuchang (196–220), Luoyang was restored to prominence when his son Cao Pi, Emperor Wen of the Wei dynasty, declared it his capital in 220 AD. The Jin dynasty, successor to Wei, was also established in Luoyang.

When Jin was overrun by Xiongnu forces in 311 AD, it was forced to move its capital to Jiankang (modern day Nanjing). The Xiongnu warriors then sacked and nearly totally destroyed Luoyang. The same fate befell Chang'an in 316 AD.

Northern Wei

In winter 416, Luoyang fell to Liu Yu's general Tan Daoji. In 422, Luoyang was captured by Northern Wei. Liu Song general Dao Yanzhi took the city back, but by 439 the Wei conquered the city definitively. In 493 AD, Emperor Xiaowen of the Northern Wei dynasty moved the capital from Datong to Luoyang and started the construction of the rock-cut Longmen Grottoes. More than 30,000 Buddhist statues from the time of this dynasty have been found in the caves. Many of these sculptures were two-faced. At the same time, the Shaolin Temple was also built by the Emperor to accommodate an Indian monk on the Mont Song right next to Luoyang City. The Yongning Temple, the tallest pagoda in China, was also built in Luoyang.

Sui-Tang dynasties
When Emperor Yang of Sui took control in 604 AD he founded the new Luoyang on the site of the existing city using a layout inspired by his father Emperor Wen of Sui's work in newly rebuilt Chang'an.

During the Tang dynasty, Luoyang was Dongdu, the "Eastern Capital", and at its height had a population of around one million, second only to Chang'an, which, at the time, was the largest city in the world.

During an interval in the Tang dynasty, the first and the only empress in Chinese history – Empress Wu, moved the capital of her Zhou dynasty to Luoyang and named it as Shen Du (Capital of the God). She constructed the tallest palace in Chinese history, which is now in the site of Sui Tang Luoyang city. Luoyang was heavily damaged during the An Lushan Rebellion.

Epitaphs were found dating from the Tang dynasty of a Christian couple in Luoyang of a Nestorian Christian Sogdian woman, Lady An (安氏), who died in 821, and her Nestorian Christian Han Chinese  husband, Hua Xian (花献), who died in 827. These Han Chinese Christian men may have married Sogdian Christian women because of a lack of Han Chinese women belonging to the Christian religion, limiting their choice of spouses among the same ethnicity. Another epitaph in Luoyang of a Nestorian Christian Sogdian woman also surnamed An was discovered and she was put in her tomb by her military officer son on 22 January, 815.  This Sogdian woman's husband was surnamed He (和) and he was a Han Chinese man and the family was indicated to be multiethnic on the epitaph pillar. In Luoyang, the mixed raced sons of Nestorian Christian Sogdian women and Han Chinese men has many career paths available for them. Neither their mixed ethnicity nor their faith were barriers and they were able to become civil officials, a military officers and openly celebrated their Christian religion and support Christian monasteries. Central Asians like Sogdians were called "Hu" (胡) by the Chinese during the Tang dynasty. Central Asian "Hu" women were stereotyped as barmaids or dancers by Han in China. Occasionally, "Hu" women would be involved in prostitution as the "Hu" women in China were at times in occupations that doubled as illicit services. 

During the short Five Dynasties and Ten Kingdoms period, Luoyang was the capital of the Later Liang (only for a few years before the court moved to Kaifeng) and Later Tang dynasty.

Later history
During the North Song dynasty, Luoyang was the 'Western Capital' and birthplace of Zhao Kuangyin, the founder of the Song dynasty. It served as a prominent cultural center, housing some of the most important philosophers. This prosperity was mainly caused by Luoyang undergoing new developments and reconstruction during this period.

During the Jurchen Jin dynasty, Luoyang was the "Middle Capital".

Since the Yuan dynasty, Luoyang was no longer the capital of China in the rest of the ancient dynasties. During the Yuan and Ming dynasties, Luoyang was razed and rebuilt twice. Its walls were destroyed by peasant rebels in the late Ming period. The city walls were then rebuilt during the Qing dynasty. The population was reduced to that of an average county. However, for one last time, Luoyang city was the capital of the Republic of China for a brief period of time during the Japanese invasion. By 1949, Luoyang's population was 75,000.

People's Republic of China

After the People's Republic of China was established, Luoyang was revived as a major heavy industrial hub. In the first five-year plan of China, 7 of 156 Soviet-aided major industrial programmes were launched in Luoyang's Jianxi District, including Dongfanghong Tractor Factory, Luoyang Mining Machines Factory and Luoyang Bearing Factory. Later, during the Third Front construction, a group of heavy industry factories was moved to or founded in Luoyang, including Luoyang Glass Factory. Industrial development significantly shifted Luoyang's demographic makeup, and about half of Luoyang's population are new immigrants after 1949 from outside the province or their descendants.

UNESCO World Heritage Site
 Longmen Grottoes, added to the UNESCO World Heritage List in 2000
 The Grand Canal – Huiluo Barn, Hanjia Barn, added to the UNESCO World Heritage List in 2014
 Silk Roads – Han Wei Luoyang City Site, Dingding Gate Site of Sui Tang Luoyang City, Xin'an Hangu Guan Site, added to the UNESCO World Heritage List in 2014

Ancient city sites 
 Erlitou Site (Zhenxun) of Xia dynasty
 Yanshi Shang City Site (Xibo) of Shang dynasty
 Wangcheng Site of Eastern Zhou dynasty
 Luoyang City Site of Han and Wei dynasty
 Luoyang City Site of Sui and Tang dynasty

Administrative divisions

The prefecture-level city of Luoyang administers 7 districts and 7 counties:

Districts
Jianxi District
Xigong District
Laocheng District
Chanhe Hui District
Luolong District
Yanshi District
Mengjin District
Defunct District
Jili District, now part of Mengjin District 
Counties
Xin'an County
Luoning County
Yiyang County
Yichuan County
Song County
Luanchuan County
Ruyang County

During the 2010 census, the 5 "built-up" urban districts held a population of 1,857,003, making it the fourth-largest city in Henan. The entire area of Luoyang's municipal government held 6,549,941 inhabitants total.

2021 administrative reorganization
With the 2017 designation of Zhengzhou as a National Central City, Henan Province in 2020 proposed a new development plan for Zhengzhou Metropolitan Area, which called for the development of Luoyang as a sub-central city. As part of this development, authorities decided to expand the urban area of Luoyang. This not only facilitated planning and coordinated use of resources and infrastructure in Luoyang, but also allowed for better integration towards Zhengzhou, as Yanshi, Jili and Mengjin previously separated the Luoyang urban area from Zhengzhou.

On 28 March 2021, the central government approved a major administrative reorganization of Luoyang city. Yanshi City was reorganized into an urban district (Yanshi District), while Jili District  and Mengjin County were merged into Mengjin District. This reorganization effectively doubled the urban area of Luoyang.

Geography
As its name states, the Old Town of Luoyang is located on the north bank of the Luo, a southern tributary of the middle reaches of the Yellow River. The districts of the modern urban center include both banks and some of the surrounding mountains.

The countryside controlled by the municipal government includes still more rugged land: mountains comprise 45.51% of the total area; hills, 40.73%; and plains, 13.8%.

Climate
Luoyang has a highly continental dry-winter humid subtropical climate (Köppen climate classification: Cwa).

Culture
Sites

The Longmen Grottoes south of the city were listed on the UNESCO list of World Heritage Sites in November 2000. Guanlina series of temples built in honor of Guan Yu, a hero of the Three Kingdoms periodis nearby.

The Luoyang Museum (established 1958) features ancient relics dating back to the Xia, Shang, and Zhou dynasties. The total number of exhibits on display is 1,700. China's only tomb museum, the Luoyang Ancient Tombs Museum, opened to the public in 1987 and is situated north of the modern town.

It was constructed in 1276 during the Yuan dynasty by Guo Shoujing as a giant gnomon for "the measurement of the sun's shadow". Prior to the Jesuit China Missions, it was used for establishing the summer and winter solstices in traditional Chinese astronomy.

Cuisine
Water Banquet, which is one of the famous banquets passed on for generations in the history of Chinese cuisine, consists of 8 cold and 16 warm dishes all cooked in various broths, gravies, or juices. The water here has two meanings: one is that all the hot dishes have soup-tang soup water; the other is that each dish is served after another smoothly just like flowing water. It comprises a wide selection of ingredients, simple and versatile, diverse tastes, sour, spicy, sweet and salty, comfortable and delicious.

Botany
Luoyang is also celebrated for the cultivation of peonies, its city flower. Since 1983, each mid-April the city hosts the Peony Culture Festival of Luoyang. More than 19 million tourists visited Luoyang during the 2014 festival.

Music
"Spring in Luoyang", an ancient Chinese composition, became popular in Korea during the Goryeo dynasty (918–1392) and is still performed in its dangak (Koreanized) version Nakyangchun. Lou Harrison, an American composer, has also created an arrangement of the work.

Dialect

Residents of Luoyang typically speak a dialect of Zhongyuan Mandarin. Although Luoyang's dialect was a prestige dialect of spoken Chinese from the Warring States period of the Zhou until the Ming dynasty, it differs from the Beijing form of Mandarin which became the basis of the standard modern dialect.

Outer space
Asteroid (239200) 2006 MD13 is named after Luoyang.

Education
Luoyang Institute of Science and Technology 
Henan University of Science and Technology 
Luoyang Normal University 
PLA Foreign Language Institute, formerly known as the Luoyang PLA College of Foreign Languages

Transportation
The city can be reached by highways, trains or planes. Long-distance buses are also an option although they generally tend to take longer. High-speed rail is the most common way to get into the city from either Xi'an or Zhengzhou.
Luoyang has a bus system of around 30+ lines.
Taxis are also a common sight in the city.

Subway 

Line 1 of Luoyang Subway opened 28 March 2021. Line 2 opened on 26 December 2021.

Rail 
Conventional speed
The main station for conventional rail services is Luoyang railway station on the Longhai railway. Guanlin railway station on the Jiaozuo–Liuzhou railway has a far less frequent service, only seeing north–south trains or vice versa that don't stop at Luoyang railway station.

high-speed
Luoyang Longmen railway station sees high-speed services on the Zhengzhou–Xi'an high-speed railway.

Road 

G30 Lianyungang–Khorgas Expressway
G36 Nanjing–Luoyang Expressway
G55 Erenhot–Guangzhou Expressway
China National Highway 207
China National Highway 310

Air 
Luoyang is served by Luoyang Beijiao Airport.

Twin towns and sister cities

Luoyang is twinned with:
  La Crosse, Wisconsin, United States
  Okayama, Okayama, Japan

Famous residents
Laozi, legendary founder of Taoism
The emperors of the Eastern Zhou dynasty
Guiguzi, geomancer and numerologist
The emperors of the Eastern Han dynasty
Xuanzang, Buddhist monk and hero of the Journey to the West
Liu Yuxi, poet
Emperor Taizu of Song, founder of the Song dynasty
Gao Hong, pipa player
Du Wei, soccer player
Wang Yibo, actor, singer, idol
Chen Dong, astronaut of Shenzhou 11 and Shenzhou 14
Meng Meiqi, singer, dancer (WJSN and Rocket Girls 101)

See also
List of twin towns and sister cities in China
 Historical capitals of China
Luoyang Longmen railway station
 Sino-Roman Relations
 Silk Road transmission of Buddhism
 Roman Catholic Diocese of Luoyang

References

Further reading
 Abramson, Marc. Ethnic Identity in Tang China. University of Pennsylvania Press (Philadelphia), 2008. .
 Cotterell, Arthur. The Imperial Capitals of China: An Inside View of the Celestial Empire. Pimlico (London), 2008. .
 Hill, John E. Through the Jade Gate to Rome: A Study of the Silk Routes during the Later Han Dynasty, 1st to 2nd Centuries CE. BookSurge (Charleston), 2009. .
 Jenner, W. J. Memories of Loyang. Clarendon Press (Oxford), 1981.
 Yang Hsüan-chih. Lo-yang ch'ien-lan chi, translated by Wang Yi-t'ung as A Record of Buddhist Monasteries in Lo-yang. Princeton University Press (Princeton), 1984. .

External links

 Official website of the Luoyang Municipal Government 
 "Wangcheng Park in Luoyang" at China.org

 
Ancient Chinese capitals
National Forest Cities in China
12th-century BC establishments
2nd-millennium BC establishments in China
Prefecture-level divisions of Henan